Anna Jarvis House is a historic home located at Webster in Taylor County, West Virginia, United States. It was built in 1854, and is a frame I-house.  It is notable as the birthplace of Anna Jarvis, founder of Mother's Day, and as General George B. McClellan's first field headquarters during his 1861 western Virginia campaign.

It was listed on the National Register of Historic Places in 1979.

References

External links
 
 Article and photos

Houses completed in 1854
Houses in Taylor County, West Virginia
Museums in Taylor County, West Virginia
Historic house museums in West Virginia
Biographical museums in West Virginia
Women's museums in the United States
National Register of Historic Places in Taylor County, West Virginia
Houses on the National Register of Historic Places in West Virginia
American Civil War sites in West Virginia
Taylor County, West Virginia, in the American Civil War
U.S. Route 250
I-houses in West Virginia